The Reunion: An Eraserheads Tribute Album (stylized as THE RƎUNION an erasɘrheads tribute album) is a tribute album for the Filipino alternative band Eraserheads. The album was released under Star Records and Star Cinema on May 9, 2012. It contains 14 Anthemic Eraserheads songs. This is the official soundtrack of the movie, The Reunion.

Track listing

References

Compilation albums by Filipino artists
Star Music compilation albums
Pop rock compilation albums
2012 compilation albums
Tribute albums